The St. John the Baptist Cathedral Also Caratinga Cathedral It is a Catholic church located in Caratinga, in the state of Minas Gerais in Brazil. Dedicated to Saint John the Baptist is also the Episcopal Diocese of Caratinga.

It is located on the Plaza Cesário Alvim, which houses a parish that has two chapels dependent on it: the chapel of St. Sebastian and the chapel of Our Lady of Aparecida.

The Parish of St. John the Baptist was created on December 1, 1873 and was formally established on October 20, 1877. When it was created, the parish was subordinate to the then diocese of Mariana. In 1880, began to construct the new church of St. John the Baptist.

On December 10, 1915, with the creation of the diocese of Caratinga, the temple was elevated to the status of a cathedral.

See also
Roman Catholicism in Brazil
St. John the Baptist Cathedral

References

Roman Catholic cathedrals in Minas Gerais
Roman Catholic churches completed in 1877
19th-century Roman Catholic church buildings in Brazil
1877 establishments in Brazil